Max Loreau (7 June 1928, in Brussels – 7 January 1990) was a 20th-century Belgian philosopher, poet and art critic

Biography 
Max Loreau is interested in the aesthetics of the Renaissance before publishing the complete catalog of works by Jean Dubuffet. He became close to the members of the Cobra movement. He devotes various articles to painters like Guillaume Corneille or Asger Jorn, before drafting a more comprehensive study of the logograms by Christian Dotremont in 1975. He also worked with Pierre Alechinsky who helped him to publish one of his last texts, L'Épreuve.

His philosophy takes root in phenomenology, from which he tries to rehabilitate the body. He starts from a genetic approach in which he tries to rethink the origin of the phenomenon as the genesis of the apparition. In Cri (Shout), he inaugurates a radical style from which he describes the effect of rupture, tearing and the void that emerges from the shout. This uncovering of the experience of language invites us to redefine the emergence of the apparition and show how the view resumes its bearings and reconstitutes a world. Starting from a critique of the Platonic vision, which fundamentally denies the body, since it is idealized as a vision of ideas, this path leads Loreau to rethink a new beginning of the body, vision and language.

Max Loreau also published various poems under the titles Cerceaux s'orcellent, Chants de la perpétuelle venue and  Florence portée aux nues.

Publications 
1966:  (essay).
1967: .
1967:  (poems).
1971:  (tirage limité).
1973:  (essay).
1973:  (essay).
1975: 
1976:  (short stories).
1977:  (poems).
1980:  (essay).
1980:  (essay)
1986:  (poems). 
1987:  (essay)
1989:  (essay)
1990:  (poems).
Posthumous :
1997: 
1998: 
2001:  (essay)
2005: 
2005: 
Poemes-Poesie, Prefazione e traduzione italiana con testo a fronte di Adriano Marchetti, Campanotto Editore, Pasian di Prato, 2012.ISBN 978-88-1292-3.
L’Epreuve-La prova, prefazione e traduzione italiana con testo a fronte, a cura di Adriano Marchetti, Panozzo Editore, Rimini, 2010.ISBN 978-88-7472-139-9
Opera da camera-Dans l’Éclat du Moment et Le Matin d’Orphé, Prefazione di Michel Deguy, Introduzione e traduzione italiana di Adriano Marchetti, Panozzo Editore, Rimini, 2005 ISBN 88-7472-056-4

Bibliography 
 Coll., Max Loreau (1928-1990), Brussels, Lebeer-Hossmann, 1991 (Contributions by Pierre Alechinsky, Francine Loreau, Michel Deguy, Éric Clemens, Bruno Van Camp, Robert Legros, Roland Hinnekens, Henri Raynal, Jacques Derrida, Jacques Bauduin). 
 Revue La part de l'œil, 14, 1998," Dossier : Hommage à Max Loreau " (Contributions hy Francine Loreau, Luc Richir, Kostas Axelos, Éric Clémens, Robert Davreu,  Eddy Devolder, Daniel Giovannangeli, Roland Hinnekens, Adriano Marchetti, Lucien Massaert, Richard Mille Henri Raynal, Éliane Escoubas, Bruno Vancamp).
 Adriano Marchetti, La parole ´natale ´ de Max Loreau. Du rythme et de la variation, in Les avatars d’un regard. L’Italie vue à travers les écrivains belges de langue française, Clueb, Bologna 1988, Pages 185-206.
 Revue « Francofonia », 41, 2001, La Quête de l’imprévisible, par Adriano Marchetti.
 Adriano Marchetti, Max Loreau, parole d’avant la parole, Entretien et traduction réalisés par Pascal Leclerc, « Le Carnet et les Instants »,123, mai-septembre 2002.
 
 Adriano Marchetti, L’endiadi orfica di Max Loreau, in Odeporica e dintorni. Cento studi per Emanuele Lanceff, t. 4, CIRVI, Moncalieri 2011.
 Véronique Verdier, Existence et création, chapitre III, Paris, OL'Harmattan, series "Ouverture philosophique", 2016, .

External links 
 LOREAU MAX on Encyclopedie universalis
 Max Loreau on the site of Éditions de Minuit
 Hommage à Max Loreau on La Part de l'Oeil (1998)
  Cri. Éclat et phases on the site of Éditions Gallimard
 Max Loreau, Présentation on Catalogue des travaux de Jean Dubuffet (Jean-Jacques Pauvert éditeur, 1967)
 Max Moreau on the site of Éditions Gallimard

20th-century Belgian poets
Belgian essayists
Belgian art critics
Writers from Brussels
1928 births
1990 deaths
Belgian male poets
20th-century Belgian male writers
20th-century essayists
20th-century Belgian philosophers